I Need You Now may refer to:

 I Need You Now (album), a 2002 album by Smokie Norful
 "I Need You Now" (1954 song), a song written by Al Jacobs and Jimmie Crane
 "I Need You Now" (Agnes song), a 2009 song by Agnes Carlsson
 "(I Need You Now) More Than Words Can Say", a 1990 song by Alias

See also
 Need You Now (disambiguation)